Edmunds Augstkalns (born August 25, 1994) is a Latvian ice hockey player currently playing for the HK Rīga of the MHL.

Playing career
Augstkalns began his hockey career playing in minor and junior Latvian hockey leagues. In 2011/2012 season he joined HK Rīga Dinamo Rīga minor league affiliate. He made his KHL debut on September 23 on win against Atlant.

References

External links

1994 births
Living people
Latvian ice hockey defencemen
HK Riga players
Dinamo Riga players
Ice hockey people from Riga